Presenilin-2 is a protein that (in humans) is encoded by the PSEN2 gene.

Function 

Alzheimer's disease (AD) patients with an inherited form of the disease carry mutations in the presenilin proteins (PSEN1; PSEN2) or the amyloid precursor protein (APP).  These disease-linked mutations result in increased production of the longer form of amyloid-beta (main component of amyloid deposits found in AD brains).  Presenilins are postulated to regulate APP processing through their effects on gamma-secretase, an enzyme that cleaves APP.  Also, it is thought that the presenilins are involved in the cleavage of the Notch receptor, such that they either directly regulate gamma-secretase activity or themselves are protease enzymes.  Two alternative transcripts of PSEN2 have been identified.

In melanocytic cells PSEN2 gene expression may be regulated by MITF.

Interactions 

PSEN2 has been shown to interact with:

 BCL2-like 1, 
 CAPN1, 
 CIB1, 
 Calsenilin,
 FHL2, 
 FLNB, 
 KCNIP4, 
 Nicastrin,  and
 UBQLN1.

References

Further reading

External links 
  GeneReviews/NCBI/NIH/UW entry on Early-Onset Familial Alzheimer Disease

Alzheimer's disease